Pure Country is a Canadian radio network, which airs on stations owned by Bell Media. Launched in 2019 as a unifying branding for all of the company's country-formatted stations across Canada, the network airs on 16 stations nationwide, as well as on selected digital subchannels of radio stations in markets where the company offers digital radio service but does not have a country-formatted primary station.

Programming
Weekday programming on the network consists of local hosts at each station in morning and afternoon drive, a national midday program hosted by Roo Phelps, and the syndicated The Bobby Bones Show in the evening (with an exception being CIMX-FM in Windsor, which clears the program in its standard morning timeslot). Sophie Moroz and Jeff Hopper, the morning hosts on the network's Ottawa station, also host a national country music chart show on weekends.

In January 2020, the network's station in Kingston committed to playing a 50/50 balance of male and female country artists for one week, to draw attention to continued gender inequity in the music business.

Stations

British Columbia
Dawson Creek - CJDC
Terrace - CJFW-FM
Vernon - CICF-FM

Manitoba
Brandon - CKXA-FM

New Brunswick
Fredericton - CKHJ
Woodstock - CJCJ-FM

Nova Scotia
Truro - CKTY-FM

Ontario
Kingston - CKLC-FM
London - CJBX-FM
Orillia - CICX-FM
Ottawa - CKKL-FM
Pembroke - CHVR-FM
Peterborough - CKQM-FM
Sudbury - CICS-FM
Toronto - CKFM-FM HD4
Windsor - CIMX-FM

Saskatchewan
Regina - CHBD-FM

References

Canadian radio networks
Bell Media

2019 establishments in Canada